Lydham Hall is a State heritage-listed former rural residence at 18 Lydham Avenue, Rockdale in New South Wales, Australia. The parcel the land purchased by Joseph Davis in 1860, was part of the original 1200 acres Grant to James Chandler, and was initially named Lydham Hill. The building currently called Lydham Hall stands on the highest point of land between the Cooks River and the Georges Rivers. The Street previously known as Joseph Street was named Lydham Avenue in 1917 at the request of one of the neighbouring property owners. In 1970, Lydham Hall was purchased by the Rockdale Municipal Council. Since the 2016 Council amalgamation, the property is owned by the Bayside Council, NSW.Bayside Council. Initially, the Permanent Conservation Order No 477 in pursuance of section 44 of the Heritage Act 1977, was applied to the property on 20th August, 1986. Since the implementation of the New South Wales State Heritage Register in 1999, Lydham Hall was included into the Heritage Register. The building is currently used as a local public museum holding a collection of furniture and objects dated from 1860s.

History 
The parcel of land on which Lydham Hall stands was part of the original 1200 acres land grant to James Chandler in the early 1820s. The property was mortgaged and eventually subdivided and sold by parcels.

In 1860, wealthy master butcher, Joseph Davis bought 50 acres 24 and a quarter perches of the original Chandler's grant and possibly used the land for resting and fattening cattle before slaughter. Davis engaged a Swedish stonemason, to construct a house on the highest point of the estate to have sweeping views of Botany Bay. Davis named his estate Lydham Hill. The exact date of building is not confirmed yet.

Davis was born in the village of Brede in Sussex in 1827, came to New South Wales in 1847 and set up business in Newtown, first as a publican and then as a butcher. On 28 October 1850, he married 17 years old Ellen Turner at Scots Church, Sydney. Davis was also a prominent man in the district and a generous benefactor to St George's Church, Hurstville and Christ Church, Bexley. He was one of the petitioners who advocated for the established of a local school in the area in 1887. This educational establishment is known now as Bexley Public School in 1888.

Davis was buying, fattening and slaughtering his own stock. 

In 1882, Davis began subdivision and selling of his land. The streets formed as a results of this subdivision were named after Davis's sons, Frederick and Herbert and his eldest grandson, Clarence.

After Davis' death, Mrs Davis sold Lydham Hill to Frederick Gibbins, a successful oyster merchant and trawling magnate, who lived nearby at Dappeto (now known as Macquarie Lodge). Ellen Davis spent the rest of her life in the Kensington House, 98 Wilson Street, Newtown, NSW. The original butcher shop and bakery in 255-257 King Street, Newtown, NSW, were left to her oldest son, Joseph Davis. 

Gibbins leased out Lydham Hill up until 1907, when his daughter Ada married David George Stead, a widow and a father of Australian writer Christina Stead. The newlyweds settled in and had six children within the next 10 years.

David Stead was a world renowned naturalist. Born on 6 March 1877 he left school at the age of 12 and began working as an apprentice to a rubber stamp maker. His scientific career began with a zoology course at Sydney Technical College. At the age of 21, he joined the Linnean Society of New South Wales and by 1900 he had written several short articles that were published by the Society. Stead's special field was in marine life and this was recognised in when he was offered employment in 1902 as a scientific assistant under the Director of Fisheries for the Commonwealth. Stead was also an outspoken conservationist and in 1909 he co-founded the Wildlife Preservation Society of Australia.

David Stead had previously been married to Ellen Butter and on 17 July 1902 had a daughter, Christina Stead. Tragically Ellen's life was cut short on 9 December 1904 when she died due to the complications of a perforated appendix.

Christina Stead was and still is one of Australia's greatest and the most esteemed writers. She was born on 17 July 1902 in a cottage in Kimpton Street, Rockdale (now known as Banksia). Christina moved into Lydham Hall with her father and his second wife Ada. During ten years at Lydham Hall, the Steads grew rapidly with Ada giving birth to six children. A great storyteller, young Christina would entertain her brothers and sisters with tales and poems. Many of Christina's novels were based on this period of her life. It is claimed that she used experiences of this time as the background for possibly her most important work, "The Man Who Loved Children". Christina did not begin her schooling until she was seven and was regarded as an excellent student during her years at Bexley Public School. After a year at Kogarah Intermediate, which later became known as St George Girls High School when it opened in 1916.

Frederick John Gibbins died in 1917 and left no particular instructions for Lydham Hill then. Dealings with all his properties were left at the discretion of Will executors, oldest daughter Emmer (Pattison) and son-in-law and accountant, husband of Gibbins' other daughter Amy, Mr William Thorn. Thom and Pattison subdivided and sold both, Dappeto and Lydham Hill therefore the Steads moved to Watson Bay. Sometime between 1917 and mid 1920s, the property became known as Lydham Hall.

Purchased by the then Rockdale Council in 1970 as part of the Rockdale Municipality Centenary Celebration, it became a home to the first and only local Museum within the area. The Museum houses a public collection consist of donations and displayed on the furniture on loan from the National Trust of Australia (NSW). The establishment of the Museum and building of its collection became the largest social project that combined the effort of the local residents, general public and local Council under the leadership of the St George Historical Society Inc.

Description 
Lydham Hall was built after 1860. This well preserved example of the early Australian rural residential home contains four large rooms, each 14x20' with a 10' wide centrally placed hall. A narrow staircase at the southern side of the hall reaches two upper rooms, each 18' 6" square lit by near dormer windows. Full length windows face north, east and south to take advantage of the cool sea breezes whilst those facing west are conventionally smaller to keep the hot westerlies at bay. 

A verandah once extended around all four sides of the house supported on open work cast iron columns. The hip roof of the house is covered with blue slates and there are a series of small decorated brackets beneath the narrow eaves. The two wide chimneys are of unusual design and each has a drip skirt placed above the flashing.

References 
 'Lydham Hall, Beyond Bricks and Mortar. From Colonial Times to 2000'. Ms Olga Sedneva, editor Mr Wesley Fairhall. Submission to 2021 Ron Rathbone Local History Prize. ISBN 978-0-6487449-6-2

Bibliography 
 'Lydham Hall. Bricks and Mortar', The Golden Jubilee Edition, 2021 Compiled by Olga Sedneva, Edited by Wesley Fairhall, Consultant Anne Field. 
 'Lydham Hall, Beyond Bricks and Mortar. From Colonial Times to 2000'. Ms Olga Sedneva, editor Mr Wesley Fairhall. Submission to 2021 Ron Rathbone Local History Prize.

Attribution 
'Lydham Hall, Beyond Bricks and Mortar. From Colonial Times to 2000'. Ms Olga Sedneva, editor Mr Wesley Fairhall. Submission to 2021 Ron Rathbone Local History Prize. ISBN 978-0-6487449-6-2

Rockdale, New South Wales
New South Wales State Heritage Register
Buildings and structures completed in 1860